Tuinicú, also known as Tunicú is a small hamlet in Encrucijada, Cuba

Geography
Tunicú has the same name as the Tunicú River, nearby the town.

History
In March 1896 during the Cuban War of Independence, general Jose Larcet Morlot went to Encrucijada, the Sagua de Chica River, Paso Real, and the Tunicu River. To later enter Santa Clara, Vega Alta, and Calabazar de Sagua.  

In the Ten Years' War rebels in Cinco Villas District went though San Gil, Ayagan, and Tunicu to then split up to get Encrucijada and Calabazar de Sagua.

References

External links
 Tuinicú (Encrucijada) - EcuRed

Populated places in Villa Clara Province